The Bionic Tower (Spanish: Torre Biónica; Chinese: 仿生塔) was a visionary vertical city, an extremely large building designed for human habitation by Spanish architects Eloy Celaya, María Rosa Cervera and Javier Gómez. The point of the Bionic Tower is to use bionics to solve the world's rising population problems in an eco-friendly way, an incredibly difficult feat to accomplish.

The Bionic Tower would be exactly 400 meters taller than the current tallest building, Burj Khalifa.

The Bionic Tower is composed of two complexes put together.  The first complex, Bionic Tower, is made up of twelve vertical neighborhoods, each eighty meters high. The neighborhoods are separated by safety areas to make for easier construction and evacuation in case of an emergency. Each neighborhood has two groups of buildings, one on the interior of the building and one on the exterior. Both groups of buildings are situated around large gardens and pools. The second complex, called the Base Island, is 1,000 meters in diameter, and is made up of many buildings, gardens, pools, and communication infrastructures. Foreseen uses of these complexes include hotels, offices, residential, commerce, cultural, sports and leisure.

In 1997, work on the prototype Bionic Vertical Space began. This was developed by the architects Eloy Celaya, María Rosa Cervera and Javier Gómez through the beginning of 2001. However, Eloy Celaya, who studied at Columbia University, is developing another project similar to the Bionic Tower project.

While in office, then-Shanghai mayor Xu Kuangdi expressed an interest in the concept for his city. Hong Kong also reportedly expressed interest in the project.

Specifications
 Authorship: Spanish architects Eloy Celaya, María Rosa Cervera and Javier Gómez.
 Urban model: vertical city.
 Inhabitants: 100,000.
 Height: .
 Stories: 300.
 Communication: 368 elevators (15 m/s, with vertical and horizontal movement).
 Footprint:  x  at base, expanding to  x  max.
 Area: .
 Artificial base island:  diameter.
 Structure: micro-structured high strength concrete (2 tonnes/cm^3 or 1372 MPa).
 Maximum sway:  lateral displacement.
 Tech. system: Bionic Vertical Tech. Space.
 Cost: USD $16 billion+.
 Location: Asia

See also
 List of tallest buildings in Hong Kong
 List of tallest buildings in Shanghai
 List of buildings with 100 floors or more
 Arcology
 Proposed tall buildings and structures

References

External links
 torrebionica.com
 you.com.au

Planned cities
Architecture in Spain
Proposed buildings and structures in China
Proposed skyscrapers in China
Unbuilt skyscrapers